Strangers is English rock band Keane's first musical-documentary DVD. It was named "Strangers" as their feelings before triumphing in music and as a reference to the song "We Might as Well Be Strangers" appearing on their debut album Hopes and Fears.
The discs contain a documentary narrated by Ed Roe, friend and photographer of Keane, and co-narrated by Keane. Band members talk about their feelings before being famous and how they succeed. Both DVDs contain Keane music and their videoclips, as well as live performances.

Contents

DVD 1
"Strangers" documentary part 1

Live performances
"Sunshine"
"With or Without You" (U2 cover on BBC Radio 1)
"Somewhere Only We Know"
"Can't Stop Now"
"She Has No Time"
"Your Eyes Open"
"This Is the Last Time"
"Allemande"

Background tracks
"Sunshine"
"Something in Me Was Dying"
"Paperback Writer" (The Beatles cover)
"Somewhere Only We Know"
"She Has No Time" (Instrumental)
"This Is the Last Time" (Instrumental)
"Can't Stop Now"
"Your Eyes Open" (Demo)
"Bedshaped"
"Allemande"
"Everybody's Changing"
"Walnut Tree"
"She Opens Her Eyes"
"Closer Now"
"The Way You Want It"
"To the End of the Earth"

Music videos
"Somewhere Only We Know" (UK, US Ver. 2) 
"This Is the Last Time" (Ver.2); Making the video
Additional documentary footage
Opinions
Hidden video: Ed Roe

DVD 2
"Strangers" documentary part 2

Live performances
"Snowed Under"
"Bedshaped"
"We Might as Well Be Strangers"
"Bend and Break"
"On a Day Like Today"
"Everybody's Changing"
"Hamburg Song"
"Try Again"

Background tracks
"Snowed Under"
"Everybody's Changing" (Instrumental)
"We Might as Well Be Strangers" (Instrumental)
"Bend and Break"
"Dinner at 8" (Rufus Wainwright cover)
Try Again (Demo)
"Fly to Me"
"Untitled 2"

Music videos
"Bedshaped" 
"Everybody's Changing" (UK, US)
Additional documentary footage
Opinions

Alternative versions
Digipack Special Edition
New additional photos

Keane (band) video albums
Direct-to-video documentary films
2005 video albums